OBC (sometimes called BCS for Beckmann Cars Sweden AB) or Ottmar Beckmann Cars AB was a car manufacturer in Mantorp, Sweden. In 1974 they presented a two seated mid-engined sports car called OBC Mantorp (named after the Mantorp Park race track). The design was somewhat similar to the Lotus Elan, but with a more rounded front. It was powered by a BMW engine mated to a Porsche gearbox. Both the chassis and bodywork was in fibreglass. The company planned a production rate of five a day with 100 employees, but it never entered production. Beckmann had tried to make sports cars in the Netherlands previously

References

External links 
 https://www.allcarindex.com/auto-car-model/Sweden-OBC-Mantorp/
 https://www.facebook.com/pg/rarecaroftheday/photos/?tab=album&album_id=391901597570562
 https://web.archive.org/web/20160317015314/http://www.viaretro.com/2014/08/en-bil-designet-til-verdens-tre-bedste-salgsargumenter-obc-mantorp/

Defunct motor vehicle manufacturers of Sweden
Mid-engined vehicles